This is a list of barbers and barber surgeons.

Ambroise Paré — a pioneering surgeon of 16th century France when barbers also performed surgery.
Hugo E. Vogel — Wisconsin assemblyman and barber for more than fifty years
Johanna Hedén — a midwife who became the first female barber surgeon in Sweden
Johnny Niggeling — a baseball player who barbered when not playing ball
Joseph Rainey — barber who became the first black US congressman
Manuel Lopes — the first black resident of Seattle who set up in business with the first barber's chair to be brought round Cape Horn. 
Peter Proby — the barber of Sir Francis Walsingham who became Master of the Worshipful Company of Barbers and Lord Mayor of London
Richard Milburn — known as Whistling Dick, he composed the famous tune "Listen to the Mocking Bird".
William Johnson — the barber of Natchez who kept an extensive diary
William L. Smith — Milwaukee barber who served as a Wisconsin assemblyman

Fictional barbers
Sweeney Todd
The Barber of Seville
Theodoric of York —  a recurring character on Saturday Night Live, played by Steve Martin

References

Hairdressing
Surgery
Lists of people by occupation